Athanasios Kanakaris-Roufos (Greek: Αθανάσιος Κανακάρης-Ρούφος, 1830–1902) was a Greek politician from Achaea.  He was mayor of the city of Patras from 1879 to 1883.

He was the son of Benizelos Roufos and brother of Georgios Roufos. Together with his brother, he helped with the reformation of Patras. During his time as mayor he ran a gaslight company in Krya Itea, planted olives southwest of downtown, opened roads, constructed Omonoia Square, ran public schools, the Markato market and constructed the race track. He died in 1902. He raised two sons Loukas Kanakaris-Roufos and Vasileios Roufos.

References
The first version of the article is translated and is based from the article at the Greek Wikipedia (el:Main Page)

1830 births
1902 deaths
MPs of Patras
Mayors of Patras
Roufos family
Politicians from Patras